Mareth is a town in Tunisia.

Mareth may also refer to:

 Mareth, a ship also called Empire Seafoam
 Mok Mareth (born 1944), a Cambodian politician